Amy Welborn (born July 17, 1960, Bloomington, Indiana) is an American Roman Catholic writer and activist, as well as a public speaker. Formerly, she was a theology teacher at a Catholic high school in Lakeland Florida and served as a parish Director of Religious Education. She was a columnist for Our Sunday Visitor. as well as for Catholic News Service.

Blog
Welborn was one of the first Catholic bloggers. She has changed her blog's name and server on three occasions. The four successive blogs have been In Between Naps (amywelborn.blogspot.com), Open Book (amywelborn.typepad.com), Charlotte Was Both (amywelborn.wordpress.com), and Via Media (blog.beliefnet.com/ViaMedia). Open Book received almost 12,000 page views per day when it was still active.

Welborn considers blogging to be an alternative venue to expose unpopular views.

Education
Welborn holds a BA in Honors History from the University of Tennessee and an MA in Church History from Vanderbilt Divinity School.

Publications
 De-Coding Da Vinci, which examines the historical accuracy of Dan Brown's novel The Da Vinci Code.
 Here. Now. A Catholic Guide to the Good Life, targeted toward teens and young adults who have questions about Catholicism and faith in general.
 The Prove It apologetics series for young people, a five-book collection of questions and answers about God, the Church, Jesus, prayer and you.
 "A Catholic Woman's Book of Days" 
  "The Loyola Kids' Book of Saints"
  "The Loyola Kids' Book of Heroes"
  "Friendship with Jesus: Pope Benedict XVI Talks to Children about their First Holy Communion"
  "Be Saints! An Invitation from Pope Benedict XVI"
  "Bambinelli Sunday:  A Christmas Blessing"

References
Five Biggest Flaws in 'The Da Vinci Code', Interview, Fox News, May 17, 2006
DaVinci Code-A Bonanza For Catholic Bloggers, Radio Roman Catholic
Dan Brown Debunked, The American Spectator, April 28, 2004

External links

 Official site
 Charlotte Was Both, current blog
 Open Book, former blog
 Booked, travel blog

1960 births
American bloggers
American Roman Catholic religious writers
Christian apologists
Living people
Writers from Bloomington, Indiana
Roman Catholic activists
University of Tennessee alumni
Vanderbilt University alumni
21st-century American non-fiction writers
Catholics from Indiana